Joan Bosch Palau (31 May 1925 - 17 November 2015) was a Spanish film director and screenwriter.

In 1946 he travelled to Morocco to work as military at the same time he was directing Las aventuras del capitán Guido (1946). He returned to Madrid and he worked as screenwriter with Antonio del Amo.

He died on 18 November 2015.

Filmography

Director

Screenwriter

References

External links
 

1925 births
2015 deaths
Spanish male screenwriters
Film directors from Catalonia